Pandemis refracta is a species of moth of the  family Tortricidae. It is found in Madagascar.

Subspecies
Pandemis refracta refracta
Pandemis refracta borealis (Diakonoff, 1960)
Pandemis refracta dormitans (Diakonoff, 1960)

References

	

Moths described in 1960
Pandemis